The black-collared swallow (Pygochelidon melanoleuca) is a species of bird in the family Hirundinidae.
It is found in Argentina, Bolivia, Brazil, Colombia, French Guiana, Guyana, Paraguay, Suriname, and Venezuela.
Its natural habitat is rivers.

This species was formerly placed in the genus Atticora. It was moved to the resurrected genus Pygochelidon based on a phylogenetic study published in 2005.

References

black-collared swallow
Birds of Paraguay
Birds of Venezuela
black-collared swallow
Taxonomy articles created by Polbot